The cabinet of Prime Minister Helle Thorning-Schmidt was the cabinet government of Denmark from 3 October 2011 to 3 February 2014. It was a coalition between the Social Democrats, the Danish Social Liberal Party and the Socialist People's Party. On 9 August 2013, Helle Thorning-Schmidt made a cabinet reshuffle and on 12 December 2013, she made a second cabinet reshuffle. The cabinet resigned on 3 February 2014, following the Socialist People's Party left the government on 30 January 2014. It was succeeded by the Cabinet of Helle Thorning-Schmidt II

Because of the government's minority status and its dependency on the support of the opposition, Venstre, the government had to jettison many of the policies that it had given during the election campaign. Although critics have accused the government of breaking its promises, other studies argue that it has already accomplished half of its stated goals, blaming instead poor public relations strategies for its increasingly negative public image.

Government formations
At the parliamentary election on 15 September 2011, the governing Liberal Party remained the single largest party with the addition of one seat while the Social Democrats lost a seat. However, a three-party coalition of opposition parties together with the supporting Red-Green Alliance won a larger share of seats than the incumbent Liberal-Conservative government and their supporting parties the Liberal Alliance and Danish People's Party. Prime Minister Lars Løkke Rasmussen then tendered the cabinet's resignation to Queen Margrethe II on 16 September, following which she met with the leaders of all parties. She then tasked Social Democrat Helle Thorning-Schmidt with negotiating the formation of a new government. Rasmussen's cabinet remained in office as a caretaker government until 3 October, when Thorning-Schmidt's cabinet was sworn in making her the first female Prime Minister. The Social Liberal Party and the Socialist People's Party also became part of the three-party government. It was the first time the Socialist People's Party joined a government since its foundation in 1959.

On 30 January 2014 Annette Vilhelmsen, the leader of Socialist People's Party announced that the party would be leaving government, the result of extended turmoil over the proposed sale of DONG Energy shares to Goldman Sachs.

List of ministers and portfolios 
The Social Democrats had ten ministers including the Prime Minister. The smaller Social Liberal Party and Socialist People's Party each had six ministers.

|}

References 

Cabinets of Denmark
2011 establishments in Denmark
Cabinets established in 2011
2014 disestablishments in Denmark
Cabinets disestablished in 2014